Dean Dorsey (born March 13, 1957 in Toronto, Ontario) is a retired Canadian football placekicker in the Canadian Football League and the National Football League.  He played college football at the University of Toronto.

Dorsey took over kicking duties with the Toronto Argonauts with the departure of Zenon Andrusyshyn during the 1982 CFL season, playing seven regular season and two playoff games.  He began a long association with Ottawa football in the 1984 CFL season playing through the 1990 CFL season.  He has gone on to coach the Ottawa Junior Riders from 1997 to 1998 and was a volunteer coach for the Ottawa Renegades.  He was even briefly considered as a replacement kicker for an injured Dan Giancola for the expansion Renegades before they finally signed Lawrence Tynes in September 2002.

Dorsey tried his hand with the NFL when he signed as a free-agent with the Green Bay Packers in 1988, played three regular season games with Green Bay, then three games with Philadelphia Eagles, going 5-for-10 in field goals (34 long) and 12-for-13 in conversion attempts.

Notes

1957 births
American football placekickers
Canadian players of American football
Canadian football placekickers
Edmonton Elks players
Green Bay Packers players
Living people
Ottawa Rough Riders players
Philadelphia Eagles players
Players of Canadian football from Ontario
Canadian football people from Toronto
Toronto Argonauts players
Toronto Varsity Blues football players
University of Toronto alumni